The Giardino Botanico "Maria Ansaldi" Pania di Corfino (about 7500m2) is a botanical garden located an altitude of 1370 m in the Appennino Tosco-Emiliano National Park, near the visitor center of Orecchiella Natural Park in Isera, Corfino, Villa Collemandina, Province of Lucca, Tuscany, Italy. It is open daily in the warmer months; an admission fee is charged.

The garden was established in 1984 to collect and preserve indigenous flora of the Apennine Mountains, Garfagnana valley and Apuan Alps . As such it reproduces environments typical of the region, including heath, hills, moor, pasture, and scree; it also contains an arboretum.

Specimens
Today the garden contains about 400 varieties of plants as well as botanical specimens and fossils.  

Species of interest include: 
 
 Alyssoides utriculata
 Caltha palustris
 Eriophorum sp.
 Erysimum pseudorhaeticum
 Gentiana purpurea
 Geum rivale
 Globularia incanescens
 Hesperis laciniata
 Lilium bulbiferum subsp. croceum
 Lilium martagon
 Linaria purpurea
 Orchis mascula
 Paeonia officinalis
 Primula apennina
 Saxifraga callosa subsp. callosa
 Sempervivum tectorum
 Swertia perennis
 Trollius europaeus. 

Trees and woody plants include: 
 
 Abies alba
 Carpinus betulus
 Castanea sativa
 Fagus sylvatica
 Juniperus nana
 Lonicera alpigena
 Ostrya carpinifolia
 Picea excelsa
 Prunus mahaleb
 Rhododendron ferrugineum
 Sambucus racemosa

See also 
 List of botanical gardens in Italy

References 
 Istituto e Museo di Storia della Scienza - Orto Botanico "Pania di Corfino"
 Regione Toscana entry (Italian)
 Horti entry (Italian)
 BGCI entry
 M. Ansaldi, "'Pania di Corfino': il perché di un nuovo Orto Botanico", Atti del Convegno: "Gli Orti Botanici d'interesse locale per la conoscenza e l'uso del territorio" (Orecchiella, 27 ottobre 1991). Studi Versiliesi, VI-VII, pp. 1988–89, 1993.
 M. Ansaldi, A. Bartelletti, and F. Lucchesi, Orto Botanico "Pania di Corfino", in Guida agli Orti Botanici della Toscana, Regione Toscana, pp. 53–61, 1992. 
 A. Barteletti, Orto Botanico "Pania di Corfino". Comunicazione alla riunione scientifica del gruppo di lavoro per gli Orti Botanici della S.B.I., "I giardini botanici dell'Appennino" Abetone, 6-7 luglio 1990. Quaderni dell'Orto Botanico Forestale di Abetone, n° 1. A cura della Comunità Montana "Appennino Pistoiese", 1992.

Botanical gardens in Italy
Province of Lucca
Gardens in Tuscany